Mayorella is a genus of Amoebozoa.

It includes:
 Mayorella bigemma
 Mayorella palestinensis

References 

Amoebozoa genera
Discosea